Joseph William Gleeson White (1851–1898), often known as Gleeson White, was an English writer on art.

Life
He was born in Christchurch, Dorset and educated at Christ Church School and afterward became a member of the Art Workers Guild. He moved to New York City in 1890 where he conducted the Art Amateur (1891–92). He returned to England in 1893. He was the first serving editor of The Studio, founded by Charles Holme in 1893 (Lewis Hind had acted as editor for four months before the launch of the magazine). In 1895 Holme took over as editor himself, although Gleeson White continued to contribute for the rest of his life. He also edited during his last years the "Ex Libris Series"; the "Connoisseur Series"; the "Pageant"; and, with Edward F. Strange, Bell's "Cathedral Series."

Publications
The published works of Gleeson White include: 
 Practical Designing (1893; third edition, 1897) 
 Salisbury Cathedral (1896) 
 English Illustrations in the Sixties (1897) 
 Master Painters of Great Britain, 4 vols. (1897–98)

References

External links
 
 

1851 births
1898 deaths
English male journalists
English writers
People from Christchurch, Dorset
19th-century British journalists
English male non-fiction writers
19th-century English male writers